Insanity Wave is a power pop band based in Madrid, Spain with a style usually defined as “snotty power pop” or “crazy guitar pop”. The band started up in 1991 formed by a bunch of high school friends. The band consists of José María Martínez (vocals and guitar), Colman Gota (vocals and bass guitar), Pablo Heras (drums and backing vocals).

History
In 1993, the band released their début, self-titled EP on La Fábrica Magnética. After two more years of touring, they released an LP—Go-Off. The album was also released in Brazil the following year, through Paradise Records.

Next, the band flew to Chicago to record an album with Jeff Murphy at Short Order Recorder. Do the Worm was released on Roto Records in Spain in 1997, and came out in the US in 1998 on spinART Records. 

In 1999, the EP and two albums were compiled, along with other early recordings, for 3X33.

Their third full-length album, The Minor League, was recorded in North Carolina with Mitch Easter at his Fidelitorium Studios, and was released on the band's own Elmer Music label in 2000. That same year, the band appeared in the Jaime Chávarri film Besos para todos, as a 1960s group called Los Acapulco

The band has also played in the big festivals such as FIB (Benicassim); Serie B ( La Rioja); Primavera Sound (Barcelona), and International Pop Overthrow (Liverpool) and has toured Portugal, Ireland, France, U.S.A. and U.K.

In  the summer of 2007 the band visited Mitch Easter to record an album slated for release later in the year.

Discography

Albums & EPs
Insanity Wave EP (1993, La Fábrica Magnética)
Go Off (1995, La Fábrica Magnética; 1996, Paradise)
Lazy-Bones EP (1996, La Fábrica Magnética)
Do the Worm (1997, Roto; 1998, spinART)
3X33 (2000)
The Minor League (2000, Elmer)
"Late Night Shift" (2009, Elmer)

Compilation and soundtrack appearances
PEPSI Generation Next (1998)
La mujer más fea del mundo soundtrack (1999)
Siete cafés por semana soundtrack (1999)
Menos es más soundtrack (2000)
Besos para todas soundtrack (2000)
Tiempo de Tormenta soundtrack (2003)

External links
 Official website
 

Musical groups from Madrid
Spanish indie rock groups
Spanish rock music groups